Michael Allen Bell (born April 22, 1968) is an American former Major League Baseball player for the Atlanta Braves and a number of minor league teams. He attended Georgia Tech in the off-season.

Bell, who was playing for the Durham Bulls when the film Bull Durham was released, wrote the name of the main character, Crash, on his bat during the 1988 season.

References

External links

Living people
1968 births
Major League Baseball first basemen
Georgia Tech Yellow Jackets baseball players
Atlanta Braves players
Richmond Braves players
Baseball players from New York (state)
Alexandria Aces players
People from Lewiston, New York
Buffalo Bisons (minor league) players
Durham Bulls players
Greenville Braves players
Sumter Braves players
Baseball players from New Jersey